Roger Tiefensee (born 1967) is a Swedish Centre Party politician, member of the Riksdag since 2002. After the 2006 Swedish general election, he was named the Centre Party's parliamentary group leader.

References

Living people
1967 births
Members of the Riksdag 2002–2006
Members of the Riksdag 2006–2010
Members of the Riksdag 2010–2014
Members of the Riksdag from the Centre Party (Sweden)